Frank H. Sobey, OC (May 24 1902 – December 15, 1985) was a Canadian businessman and art collector who was the primary builder of the Sobeys chain of supermarkets.

Life and career
Born in the farming community of Lyons Brook, Nova Scotia, to John William (J.W.) Sobey and Eliza Sobey, he was three years old when his family moved to the nearby then-booming coal-mining town of Stellarton. In 1907, his father purchased a meat retailing business and became a butcher, peddling meat products door-to-door from a horse-drawn wagon. In 1912, his father built a 2-storey store in Stellarton's central business district, selling mostly meat and vegetables.

In an era where education opportunities were limited in small Maritime towns, Sobey left school after Grade 8. However, he had an entrepreneurial mindset, and at age sixteen enrolled in a business college. In 1924 he persuaded his father to expand the store to carry a full range of groceries and the family began expanding, opening stores in the nearby industrial towns of New Glasgow, Trenton and Westville, and the university town of Antigonish. In the early 1940s, the family wished to purchase a building on Archimedes Street in New Glasgow for a supermarket. The property was owned by a company named Empire Company Ltd. and to acquire the building, the family purchased the company itself. Empire was transformed into the family's holding company and was privatized in 1981.

Through Empire Company Ltd., Sobey purchased a local drive-in theatre (renaming it Empire Theatre) and later built a chain of movie theaters, in addition to substantial commercial and residential real estate holdings. In 1971, while still active in the business, Sobey handed over formal control of the company's operations to his three sons, Bill, David and Donald. In the late 1950s, Premier Robert Stanfield appointed Sobey as president of Industrial Estates Limited with a salary of $1/year; Sobey is credited with guiding IEL to make investments in the 1960s that significantly expanded and diversified Nova Scotia's economy. Sobey was also one of the investors behind Peter Munk (chairman of Barrick Gold) in founding Clairtone.

Sobey received an honorary Doctor of Laws from Saint Mary's University in Halifax, Nova Scotia, and the university named its Faculty of Commerce in his honour. In 1985, he was made an Officer of the Order of Canada and was inducted into the Canadian Business Hall of Fame.

Sobey married Irene MacDonald on November 24, 1924. They had four children: Bill, David, Donald and Dianne. 

He died in Halifax in 1985 at the age of 83.

Sobey Foundation
In 1982, Sobey endowed the Sobey Foundation to provide funding for important initiatives with positive and long-lasting impacts on health, education and communities. The Frank H. Sobey Awards in Business Studies annually provide $10,000 to full-time business students from any Atlantic Canadian university. Saint Mary's University named its commerce program the Sobey School of Business.

Sobey Art Foundation 
Sobey and his wife Irene acquired a significant art collection that included works by Cornelius Krieghoff, Tom Thomson and notable Group of Seven members A. Y. Jackson and Arthur Lismer. The collection can be seen today at Crombie House, Sobey's former residence in Abercrombie, Nova Scotia. The Sobey Art Foundation was established in 1985 with a mandate to maintain and augment the collection. The foundation's Sobey Art Award is Canada's largest prize for young Canadian artists. It is awarded every two years to an artist 39 years of age or younger who has exhibited work in a public or commercial art gallery in Canada during the previous 18 months. The winner receives up to $70,000 and the 3 runners-up $1,000.

References

 Bruce, Harry. Frank Sobey: The Man and the Empire (1985 - Macmillan of Canada) 
 Pitts, Gordon. The Codfathers: Lessons from the Atlantic Business Elite. (2005 – Key Porter Books 
 Nina Munk. My Father's Brilliant Mistake''. 2008, May 12. Canadian Business https://web.archive.org/web/20130225103938/http://www.ninamunk.com/documents/ClairtoneLesson.htm

1902 births
1985 deaths
Businesspeople from Nova Scotia
Canadian grocers
Canadian art collectors
Canadian philanthropists
Sobey, Frank
Officers of the Order of Canada
People from Pictou County